is a Japanese manga artist. He debuted in 2011 with As the Gods Will, which was adapted into a live-action film. After serializing several other works, he launched Blue Lock with Yusuke Nomura in 2018, which won the 45th Kodansha Manga Award in the shōnen category.

Biography
Kaneshiro debuted as a manga artist in 2011, with the story for As the Gods Will, which released its first chapter on February 9, 2011. The first series was completed on October 9, 2012, with a second series starting on January 16, 2013. The second series finished on December 28, 2016. In December 2013, it was reported the manga had sold 1.5 million copies. The series also received a live-action film adaptation.

In August 2011, Kaneshiro did the story for a manga adaptation of Konami's social network game Dragon Collection. In 2015, Keneshiro did the story for the manga Bokutachi ga Yarimashita, which received a live-action television series adaptation. Starting on February 6, 2017, he did the story for the manga Jagaaan. Starting in July 2017, he did the story for Gnoshros.

On August 1, 2018, he launched Blue Lock with Yusuke Nomura. In August 2021, it was reported that Blue Lock had over 4.5 million copies in circulation. The series won the 45th Kodansha Manga Award in the shōnen category in 2021. An anime television series adaptation premiered in October 2022.

Works
  (2011–2012) (serialized in Bessatsu Shōnen Magazine; illustrated by Akeji Fujimura)
  (2013–2016) (serialized in Weekly Shōnen Magazine; illustrated by Akeji Fujimura)
  (2011–2012) (serialized in Weekly Shōnen Magazine; illustrated by Kyōta Shibano)
  (2014–2017) (serialized in Manga Box; illustrated by Naoki Serizawa)
  (2015–2017) (serialized in Weekly Young Magazine; illustrated by Hikari Araki)
  (2017–2021) (serialized in Big Comic Spirits; illustrated by Kensuke Nishida)
  (2017–2018) (serialized in Weekly Young Magazine; illustrated by Akeji Fujimura)
  (2018–present) (serialized in Weekly Shōnen Magazine; illustrated by Yusuke Nomura)
  (2022–present) (serialized in Big Comic Superior; illustrated by Akira Hiramoto)

References

External links
 

Living people
Manga artists
Winner of Kodansha Manga Award (Shōnen)
Year of birth missing (living people)